Bob and Mike Bryan were the defending champions, but lost in the final to Eric Butorac and Raven Klaasen, 4–6, 4–6.

Seeds

Draw

Draw

References
 Main Draw

U.S. National Indoor Tennis Championships - Doubles
2014 Men's Doubles